Abdullah Sayid al-Mansoori is a Bahraini naval officer. He held several senior command positions, including Commander Royal Bahrain Naval Force, Commander Combined Task Force 152, and Commander Flotilla. Al-Mansoori also has a PhD in international relations and was awarded the Legion of Merit. He is currently the head of the national defence college of Bahrain.

References

Living people
Bahraini military personnel
Year of birth missing (living people)